Muslim League  may refer to:

Political parties

Subcontinent
 British India
All-India Muslim League, Mohammed Ali Jinah, led the demand for the partition of India resulting in the creation of Pakistan.
Punjab Muslim League, a branch of the organization above.
Unionist Muslim League, the autonomous Punjab unit of the All India Muslim League, under the leadership of Sir Sikandar Hayat Khan.
All-India Jamhur Muslim League, formed in 1940 to counter the All-India Muslim League's plans for a separate Pakistan.

 Pakistan
Historical
Muslim League (Pakistan), the original successor to the All-India Muslim League, lasting from independence to 1958.
Convention Muslim League, a brief discontent faction of the Pakistan Muslim League, formed in 1962
Council Muslim League, a brief discontent faction of the Convention Muslim League
Muslim League (Qayyum), a political party formed in 1970
Pakistan Muslim League (J), a political party from 1993 to 2004
Pakistan Muslim League (Jinnah), a political party from 1995 to 2004
Pakistan Peoples Muslim League, a political party from 2009 to 2013

Modern
Pakistan Muslim League, a series of political coalitions in Pakistan, from 1962 onward
Pakistan Muslim League (N), a center-right political party, and following the 2013 election the largest political force in the country
Pakistan Muslim League (Q), a centre-nationalist political party with a small presence in Parliament
Pakistan Muslim League (F), a centrist, nationalist, and pro-Hurs clan political party mainly active in Sindh
Pakistan Muslim League (Z), a political party formed in 2002
Awami Muslim League (Pakistan),  a political party formed in June 2008
All Pakistan Muslim League, a political party founded by Pervez Musharraf in 2010

Bangladesh
Bangladesh Awami League, named the All Pakistan Awami Muslim League until 1953
Bangladesh Muslim League, A registered political party with Islamist Ideology 

India
Indian Union Muslim League, an Islamic political party, mainly active in Kerala
Muslim League (Opposition), a party founded in Kerala in 1973; merged with the Indian Union Muslim League in 1985
Indian National League
All India Muslim League (2002), a political party that was formed in Tamil Nadu in 2002

Eritrea
 Moslem League of the Western Province
 Independent Moslem League

Fiji
 Fiji Muslim League

Other
 Muslim World League, an international Islamic non-governmental organization in Saudi Arabia

See also 
 Muslim League Schisms
 Awami Muslim League (disambiguation)